Fort Seybert is an unincorporated community located in Pendleton County, West Virginia, United States. This town was named for Captain Jacob Seybert, who built an early stockade here. It was captured by Native Americans in 1758, who spared only eleven lives (see Bemino). Fort Seybert is the only place in the United States with this name.

Fort Seybert is located along the South Fork South Branch Potomac River.

External links
Fort Seybert Massacre (1758) at the WV Division of Culture and History
Community news and information

Unincorporated communities in Pendleton County, West Virginia
Unincorporated communities in West Virginia